Peter Patrick Murphy (July 18, 1801 Albany, New York – January 20, 1880 Royalton, Niagara County, New York) was an American physician and politician from New York. He was also a mason.

Life
He was the son of Peter Murphy (c.1779–1844) and Catherine (Conner) Murphy (c.1781–1846). He attended The Albany Academy. In 1820, he removed to Herkimer County, and taught school. Then he studied medicine in Cherry Valley, graduated from Fairfield Medical College in 1827, and practiced medicine in Stark. On December 30, 1827, he married Anna Kayner (b. 1806), and they had several children.

As a Democrat, he was a member of the New York State Assembly (Herkimer Co.) in 1835. Afterwards he resumed the practice of medicine in Royalton, New York. In 1848, he joined the Free Soil Party, and in 1855 became a Republican. He was a delegate to the 1856 Republican National Convention. He was Supervisor of the Town of Royalton for one term; and a member of the New York State Senate (29th D.) in 1860 and 1861.

Sources
 The New York Civil List compiled by Franklin Benjamin Hough, Stephen C. Hutchins and Edgar Albert Werner (1867; pg. 364 and 442)
 Biographical Sketches of the State Officers and Members of the Legislature of the State of New York by William D. Murphy (1861; pg. 97ff)
 Marriage records of the Reformed Church of Columbia, Herkimer Co.
 Bio at Herkimer NY Gen Web

1801 births
1880 deaths
People from Herkimer County, New York
New York (state) state senators
Politicians from Albany, New York
New York (state) Republicans
Members of the New York State Assembly
People from Royalton, New York
Town supervisors in New York (state)
New York (state) Democrats
19th-century American politicians
Physicians from Albany, New York
The Albany Academy alumni